The 2007 Tuen Mun District Council election was held on 18 November 2007 to elect all 29 elected members to the 37-member District Council.

Overall election results
Before election:

Change in composition:

References

External links
 Election Results - Overall Results

2007 Hong Kong local elections